Pot o' Gold is a 1941 American romantic musical comedy film starring James Stewart and Paulette Goddard, directed by George Marshall, and based on the radio series Pot o' Gold. The film was released April 3, 1941, eight months before the NBC radio series came to an end. Paulette Goddard's singing voice was dubbed by Vera Van.
The film was known as The Golden Hour in the United Kingdom and was re-released in 1946 by Astor Pictures as Jimmy Steps Out.

Plot 

Jimmy Haskell is the owner of a music store. His uncle, C.J. Haskell, dislikes music and has long wanted Jimmy to join him in his health food business. Jimmy agrees only after his music store closes. When Jimmy arrives at his uncle's place, he is confronted by members of the McCorkle family, who play in Heidt's band and often practice near C.J.'s business. C.J. is infuriated and attempts to stop the band using the police. Jimmy unintentionally throws a tomato at him, which makes a good impression on the band and the McCorkles, who do not know his true identity. Molly McCorkle falls in love with him.

When Jimmy substitutes for C.J. on his radio program, two band members find out who he is. They devise a scheme to persuade C.J. to take a vacation. In the meantime, Jimmy takes over the operation of the business and invites Heidt's band to play on the show. Molly learns Jimmy's identity, and in anger, she says on-air that the Haskell program will give away $1000 every week. To protect her from prosecution, Jimmy claims the idea is his. He then has to find a way to give away the cash; a federal investigator informs him that there are many legal restrictions that make every scheme Jimmy and his associates can think up illegal.

Jimmy finally comes up with a method just before the show airs. He gets a bunch of telephone books and steals a carnival wheel to select first the telephone book, then the page in it and finally the entry on the page to determine the winner. The giveaway is immensely popular, with advertisers clamoring to sign up. This reconciles the Haskells and McCorkles, paving the way for Jimmy and Molly to get married.

Cast 
 James Stewart as James Hamilton "Jimmy" Haskell
 Paulette Goddard as Molly McCorkle
 Horace Heidt as Himself
 Charles Winninger as Charles "C.J." Haskell
 Mary Gordon as Mom McCorkle
 Frank Melton as Jasper Backus
 Jed Prouty as J.K. Louderman
 Charles Arnt as Parks (butler)
 Dick Hogan as Willie McCorkle
 James Burke as Police Lt. Grady
 Donna Wood as Donna McCorkle
 Larry Cotton as Larry Cotton, Vocalist
 Art Carney as Radio Announcer (uncredited)

Background 

Pot o' Gold was radio's first big-money giveaway program, garnering huge ratings within four weeks of its 1939 debut. The program's success prompted production of the film. The premise of the radio program, created by Ed Byron, was that any person who picked up the telephone when host Horace Heidt called would automatically win $1000. Phone numbers were chosen by three spins on the Wheel of Fortune: (1) choice of phone directory, (2) page number and (3) the line on the page. The series ran on NBC from September 26, 1939 to December 23, 1941 and later a new show by the same name from October 2, 1946 to March 26, 1947 on ABC.

Soundtrack 
 Various characters - "Hi, Cy, What's A-Cookin'?" (Written by Henry Russell and Louis Forbes)
 Paulette Goddard (dubbed by Vera Van) with Horace Heidt & His Musical Knights - "Pete the Piper" (Written by Henry Russell)
 James Stewart - "When Johnny Toots His Horn" (Written by Hy Heath and Fred Rose)
 Horace Heidt & His Musical Knights - "A Knife, a Fork and a Spoon" (Written by Dave Franklin)
 Larry Cotton with Horace Heidt & His Musical Knights - "Do You Believe in Fairy Tales?" (Music by Vee Lawnhurst, lyrics by Mack David)
 Paulette Goddard (dubbed by Vera Van) with Horace Heidt & His Musical Knights - "Broadway Caballero" (Written by Henry Russell)

Reception 
Stewart later referred to the film as the worst one he ever appeared in.

Nine years later, Stewart did another movie about a big-money radio show, The Jackpot (1950).

References

External links 

 
 
 
 
 

1941 films
1941 musical comedy films
1941 romantic comedy films
American musical comedy films
Films based on radio series
American romantic comedy films
American romantic musical films
1940s English-language films
American black-and-white films
Films directed by George Marshall
United Artists films
1940s romantic musical films
1940s American films